This is a list of winners of the Daytime Emmy Award for Outstanding Performer In An Animated Program. The award was presented between 1995 and 2021. It recognized a continuing or single voice-over performance in a series or a special. The performance generally originated from a Children's Animated, Special Class Animated Program.

In November 2021, it was announced that all Daytime Emmy categories honoring children's programming would be retired. This category in particular was broadened to three separate categories at the Children's & Family Emmy Awards beginning in 2022:
Outstanding Voice Performance in a Preschool Animated Program, Outstanding Voice Performance in an Animated Program and Outstanding Younger Voice Performer in an Animated or Preschool Animated Program.

Award winners

1990s
1995: Lily Tomlin – The Magic School Bus as Valerie Felicity Frizzle
Roscoe Lee Browne – Spider-Man as Kingpin
Tim Curry – Mighty Max as Skullmaster
Ruby Dee – Whitewash as Grandmother
Rita Moreno – Where on Earth Is Carmen Sandiego? as Carmen Sandiego
1996: Nathan Lane – Timon & Pumbaa as Timon
Ed Asner – Spider-Man as J. Jonah Jameson
Keith David – Gargoyles as Goliath
Rita Moreno – Where on Earth Is Carmen Sandiego? as Carmen Sandiego
Ernie Sabella – Timon & Pumbaa as Pumbaa
Lily Tomlin – The Magic School Bus as Valerie Felicity Frizzle
1997: Louie Anderson – Life with Louie as Louis and Andy Anderson
Dennis Franz – Mighty Ducks as Captain Klegghorn
Rita Moreno – Where on Earth Is Carmen Sandiego? as Carmen Sandiego
Rob Paulsen – Pinky and the Brain as Pinky
Lily Tomlin – The Magic School Bus as Valerie Felicity Frizzle
1998: Louie Anderson – Life with Louie as Louis and Andy Anderson
Maurice LaMarche – Pinky and the Brain as the Brain
Rob Paulsen – Pinky and the Brain as Pinky
Lily Tomlin – The Magic School Bus as Valerie Felicity Frizzle
Robin Williams – Great Minds Think for Themselves as Genie
1999: Rob Paulsen – Pinky and the Brain as Pinky
Louie Anderson – Life with Louie as Louis and Andy Anderson
Ernest Borgnine – All Dogs Go to Heaven: The Series as Carface Caruthers
Dom DeLuise – All Dogs Go to Heaven: The Series as Itchy Itchiford
Jeffrey Tambor – The Lionhearts as Hank

2000s
2000: James Woods – Hercules as Hades
Pam Grier – Happily Ever After: Fairy Tales for Every Child as The Nightingale
Robert Guillaume – Happily Ever After: Fairy Tales for Every Child as The Narrator
Nathan Lane – George and Martha as George
French Stewart – Hercules as Icarus
2001: Nathan Lane – Teacher's Pet as Spot/Scott
Ruby Dee – Little Bill as Alice the Great
Kel Mitchell – Clifford the Big Red Dog as T-Bone
John Ritter – Clifford the Big Red Dog as Clifford
Cree Summer – Clifford the Big Red Dog as Cleo
2002: Charles Shaughnessy – Stanley as Dennis
Jackie Chan – Jackie Chan Adventures as himself
Kel Mitchell – Clifford the Big Red Dog as T-Bone
John Ritter – Clifford the Big Red Dog as Clifford
Alicia Silverstone – Braceface as Sharon Spitz
2003: Gregory Hines – Little Bill as Big Bill
Mindy Cohn – What's New, Scooby-Doo? as Velma Dinkley
Walter Cronkite – Liberty's Kids as Benjamin Franklin 
Ruby Dee – Little Bill as Alice the Great
John Ritter – Clifford the Big Red Dog as Clifford
2004: Joe Alaskey – Duck Dodgers as Duck Dodgers
Nancy Cartwright – Kim Possible as Rufus
Walter Cronkite – Liberty's Kids as Benjamin Franklin 
John Ritter – Clifford the Big Red Dog as Clifford
Henry Winkler – Clifford's Puppy Days as Norville
2005: Henry Winkler – Clifford's Puppy Days as Norville
Mel Brooks – Jakers! The Adventures of Piggley Winks as Wiley
Joan Cusack – Peep and the Big Wide World as The Narrator 
Kevin Michael Richardson – The Batman as The Joker
Christy Carlson Romano – Kim Possible as Kim Possible
2006: Maile Flanagan – Jakers! The Adventures of Piggley Winks as Piggley Winks  
Tony Jay – Miss Spider's Sunny Patch Friends as Spiderus
Jess Harnell – Pet Alien as Swanky and Gumpers
Tara Strong – Jakers! The Adventures of Piggley Winks as Dannan
Russi Taylor – Jakers! The Adventures of Piggley Winks as Ferny
2007: Eartha Kitt – The Emperor's New School as Yzma
Jim Conroy – Fetch! with Ruff Ruffman as Ruff Ruffman 
Maile Flanagan – Jakers! The Adventures of Piggley Winks as Piggley Winks
Danica Lee – Wonder Pets as Ming-Ming Duckling
Russi Taylor – Jakers! The Adventures of Piggley Winks as Ferny
2008: Eartha Kitt – The Emperor's New School as Yzma
Jessica DiCicco – The Emperor's New School as Malina
Danica Lee – Wonder Pets as Ming Ming
Christopher Lloyd – Cyberchase as  The Hacker
Kevin Michael Richardson – The Batman as The Joker
2009: Jim Ward - Biker Mice from Mars as Eyemore and The Crusher
Jim Cummings – My Friends Tigger & Pooh as Tigger
Amy Poehler – The Mighty B! as Bessie Higgenbottom
Joan Rivers – Arthur as Bubbe
Vanessa Williams – Mama Mirabelle's Home Movies as Mama

2010s
2010: Eartha Kitt – Wonder Pets!: Save the Cool Cat and the Hip Hippo as Cool Cat
Ed Asner – WordGirl: Meat My Dad as Kid Potato
Philip Seymour Hoffman – Arthur: No Acting Please as Will Toffman
Amy Poehler – The Mighty B! as Bessie Higgenbottom
2011: Danny Jacobs – The Penguins of Madagascar as King Julien
Peter Cullen – Transformers: Prime as Optimus Prime
Bill Farmer – Mickey Mouse Clubhouse as Goofy
Tom McGrath – The Penguins of Madagascar as Skipper
Martin Short – The Cat in the Hat Knows a Lot About That! as The Cat in the Hat
Steven Tyler – The Wonder Pets as The Mad Hatter
2012: June Foray – The Garfield Show: Which Witch as Mrs. Cauldron
Jeff Bennett - The Penguins of Madagascar as Kowalski
Rodger Bumpass - SpongeBob SquarePants as Squidward Tentacles
James Hong - Kung Fu Panda: Legends of Awesomeness as Mr. Ping
2013: David Tennant – Star Wars: The Clone Wars as Huyang
Curtis Armstrong – Dan Vs. as Dan
Jim Cummings – Star Wars: The Clone Wars as Hondo Ohnaka
Jerry Trainor – T.U.F.F. Puppy as Dudley Puppy
Sam Witwer – Star Wars: The Clone Wars as Darth Maul
2014: Hayley Faith Negrin – Peg + Cat as Peg
Sarah Bolt – Peter Rabbit as Jemima Puddleduck
Alan Cumming – Arthur: Show Off as Sebastian Winkleplotz
Dwayne Hill – Peg + Cat as Cat
Ashley Tisdale – Sabrina: Secrets of a Teenage Witch as Sabrina Spellman
2015: Danny Jacobs – All Hail King Julien as King Julien
Mark Hamill – Star Wars: The Clone Wars: Sacrifice as Darth Bane
Christopher Lloyd – Cyberchase: The Cyberchase Movie as  The Hacker
Megan Mullally – Sofia the First: The Enchanted Feast as Miss Nettle
Dick Van Dyke – Mickey Mouse Clubhouse: Mickey's Pirate Adventure as Captain Goof Beard
2016: Jeff Bennett – Transformers: Rescue Bots as Mayor Luskey
Carlos Alazraqui – The Fairly OddParents as Mr. Crocker
Eric Bauza – The Adventures of Puss in Boots as Puss in Boots and Sino.
Danny Jacobs – All Hail King Julien as King Julien
Reid Scott – Turbo FAST as Turbo
2017: Kelsey Grammer – Trollhunters as Blinky
Danny Jacobs – All Hail King Julien as King Julien, Pancho
Kate McKinnon – Nature Cat as Squeeks
Andy Richter – All Hail King Julien as Mort/Smart Mort/Morticus Khan and Ted
Rick Zieff – The Tom and Jerry Show as Spike
2018: Tom Kenny – SpongeBob SquarePants as SpongeBob SquarePants
Chris Diamantopoulos – Skylanders Academy as  Master Eon
Tress MacNeille – VeggieTales in the City as Aprilcot, Madame Blueberry, Junior Asparagus, Lisa Asparagus and Night Pony
Andy Richter – All Hail King Julien as Mort/Grammy Mort and Smart Mort
John Tartaglia – Splash and Bubbles as Splash & Mrs. Tidy
2019: Jay Baruchel - Dragons: Race to the Edge as Hiccup
Bob Bergen - Wabbit: A Looney Tunes Production as Porky Pig
Chris Diamantopoulos – Mickey Mouse as  Mickey Mouse
Mark Hamill – Kulipari: Dream Walker as Old Jir and Caz
Marieve Herington – Big City Greens as Tilly Green
Ruth Negga – Angela's Christmas as Mother

2020s
2020: Tom Kenny – SpongeBob SquarePants as SpongeBob SquarePants
Paget Brewster  – DuckTales as Della Duck
Marieve Herington – Big City Greens as Tilly Green
Chris Houghton – Big City Greens as Cricket Green
Parker Simmons – Mao Mao: Heroes of Pure Heart as Mao Mao
2021: Parker Simmons - Mao Mao: Heroes of Pure Heart as Mao Mao
 Eric Bauza - Looney Tunes Cartoons as Bugs Bunny/Daffy Duck
 Tom Kenny – SpongeBob SquarePants as SpongeBob SquarePants
 Tress MacNeille - Animaniacs as Dot Warner
 Jonathan Pryce - Piney: The Lonesome Pine as Grandpa Sid

Programs with multiple awards
2 awards
 Life with Louie
 The Emperor's New School
 SpongeBob SquarePants

Multiple wins 
3 wins
 Eartha Kitt
2 wins
 Louie Anderson
 Danny Jacobs
 Nathan Lane
 Tom Kenny

Total awards
Nickelodeon - 5
Cartoon Network/PBS - 4
Disney/Fox/Netflix - 3
ABC - 2
CBS/Syndication/The WB/Discovery Family - 1

Multiple nominations 
4 nominations
 Danny Jacobs
 John Ritter
 Lily Tomlin

3 nominations
 Louie Anderson
 Ruby Dee
 Eartha Kitt 
 Nathan Lane
 Rita Moreno
 Rob Paulsen
 Tom Kenny

2 nominations
 Ed Asner
 Eric Bauza
 Jeff Bennett
 Jim Cummings
 Walter Cronkite 
 Chris Diamantopoulos
 Maile Flanagan
 Mark Hamill
 Marieve Herington
 Danica Lee
 Christopher Lloyd
 Tress MacNeille 
 Kel Mitchell
 Kevin Michael Richardson
 Amy Poehler
 Andy Richter
 Parker Simmons
 Russi Taylor
 Henry Winkler

References

Retired Daytime Emmy Awards